Bay of Pigs is an EP by Destroyer released on August 19, 2009, on 12" vinyl.

Musical Style

Pitchfork described "Bay of Pigs" as starting with "one synth wash over another ... and a little spanish guitar" before turning into a lite-disco style song with "an improbably shimmering guitar" and a "clockwork rhythm". "Ravers" is a slower version of Destroyer's Trouble in Dreams track "Rivers", with Exclaim! magazine stating that Bay of Pigs represented a "dreamy, synth-filled direction".

Personnel
Dan Bejar
John Collins
David Carswell
Ted Bois

Track listing

Vinyl version

Digital version

References

External links
Merge Records EP info
Destroyer Lyrics Wiki

2009 EPs
Destroyer (band) EPs
Merge Records EPs